The SportStar and EuroStar are a family of a two-seat, light sport aircraft (LSA), manufactured by Evektor-Aerotechnik of the Czech Republic and powered by a Rotax 912ULS,  engine.

The SportStar was the first approved special light-sport aircraft (S-LSA) and was named "S-LSA Aircraft of the Year" in 2011 by AeroNews Network. According to Flight International, the SportStar held the number-one seller spot in 2005, which the periodical attributed to its high range of options and overall affordability.

Development
Development of the SportStar is closely entangled with its Eurostar sibling; while the former was specifically developed to meet the needs of the light-sports aircraft (LSA) sector of the general aviation market, the lighter EuroStar was designed for the ultralight-microlight (UL-ML) portion of the European market. The two aircraft, which have been grouped together in the same family by their manufacturer, are visually similar; however, the SportStar is slightly heavier and larger aircraft than the Eurostar, the former having a greater wingspan and a marginally wider fuselage. The 550kg maximum weight of the SportStar was a deliberate choice by Evektor so that the aircraft would be compliant with the relatively stringent LSA limitations enacted in countries such as Australia and Canada.

The SportStar RTC design was reportedly based on the EASA's JAR-VLA certified aircraft standards; Evektor claims it to reflect the latest development in design, safety and cockpit comfort present amongst modern light sport aircraft. Furthermore, according to Evektor, the SportStar was developed to achieve relatively low costs of operation, along with ease of maintenance, and to specifically satisfy the needs of flight schools. It is claimed by the manufacturer that the aircraft is capable of achieving half of the typical operating costs incurred by contemporary training aircraft. According to Flight International, the cost of consumables for the type is comparable to those of a typical car, while the overall operating costs, including depreciation, engine and maintenance reserves, is roughly around €45 per flight hour if flown for a typical 200 hours per year.

Following the FAA's finalisation of the Sport Pilot/Light Sport Aircraft rule in April 2005, the SportStar became the first aircraft to be certified in the United States as an LSA. Prior receiving certification in the US, the SportStar had already established itself in the European market, particularly as a reliable trainer. By the end of 2006, a total of 600 SportStars were reportedly in service around the world.

Design
The SportStar is a two-seat light sport aircraft, intended for recreational flying, touring, basic flight training, and towing roles. It possesses a relatively low-mounted wing along with a bubble canopy, which provides high level of exterior visibility, a particularly desirable attribute for a trainer aircraft. The SportStar is capable of towing sailplanes up to 1544 lbs (700 kg) gross weight, as well as towing banners of up to 1479 sq ft (140 m2). It can also be configured as an amphibian when outfitted with suitable floats. For the safety of its occupants, the SportStar can be furnished with a rocket-boosted recovery parachute, which fires upwards and sideways through an aperture in the forward engine panel; this system, which is an option, is manually triggered by the pilot via a handle in the cockpit.

The SportStar is powered by a single Rotax 912ULS air-cooled piston engine, which typically drives a three-bladed VZLU V230C variable-pitch propeller, although alternative propeller designs of both fixed and variable pitches can also be fitted. This engine can be operated using automotive-standard unleaded petrol; avgas and mogas can also be used for limited periods if required. A push/pull throttle lever is the primary engine control, this being centrally mounted in the base of the instrument panel; it incorporates an uncommon twist function to make fine adjustments to the engine's rpm without moving the lever. A centrally-located propeller lever mounted on the cockpit floor is used to adjust the pitch of the propeller. Electrical power is provided by an engine-driven generator that charges a single 12V battery.

The SportStar comprises a mostly-metal construction, being primarily composed of anodized, corrosion-proofed aluminum; a limited number of composite materials have also been used in areas such as panels. As a consequence of the high use of conventional aluminium, the airframe is relatively easy to repair as well as affordable to construct. The airframe uses a pop-riveted and bonded construction, which the company claims will improve fatigue characteristics and result in a longer service life. The company has also claimed that this construction technique results in better crashworthiness qualities, as well as the elimination of rivet zippering during an accident, and results in quieter noise levels in-flight due to the elimination of oil-canning and flexing tendencies.

The cockpit is provided with electrically-operated flight instrumentation, along with a VHF radio unit, transponder, GPS and ILS navigation systems, and lighting. In a typical arrangement, five standard flight instruments are present in the console, although the layout of this instrumentation and the installation of various other instruments are options available to customers. Conventional analogue engine indicators are installed to the right of the instrumentation console. The cockpit can be heated via ducted engine air, while cooling is provided via compact openable panels in the canopy. The wing, which was developed in-house, features manually-actuated split flaps that can be set to four positions as standard; electrically-actuated flaps are available as an option. Early production aircraft had a centrally-mounted single fuel tank behind the seats with a maximum capacity of 65 litres; this was replaced on later-built aircraft by a pair of integral fuel tanks within the wings for a maximum capacity of 120 litres, thus allowing the fuselage space freed up to be used for baggage or other equipment.

Variants
EuroStar SL
Model for the European ultralight category, with a gross weight of 
EuroStar SL+
More than 1,000 have been built and it was one of the top ten ultralights sold in Germany in 2014 according to Aerokurier.
EuroStar SLW
It combines the EuroStar fuselage with the wing and stabilizer from the Harmony.
Harmony
Model for the US LSA market, based on the Harmony airframe, with enlarged ailerons and rudder to improve crosswind capabilities, an improved wing, winglets and tail, wider and longer cockpit, as well as refined wheel pants and other fairings.
SportStar
Initial model
SportStar SL
Improved model
SportStar Max
Version for the US LSA market with a gross weight of 
SportStar RTC
SportStar RTC was developed to meet EASA VLA certification and intended for use in flight training.
Evektor EPOS
Electric aircraft version, using the SportStar RTC fuselage and a new wing design.

Specifications (SportStar Max)

References

External links

 Evektor SportStar Max Light Sport Aircraft overview via YouTube.com
 Evektor SportStar: Czech Mate via planeandpilotmag.com
 Popular SportStar undergoing club trials via kiwiflyer.co.nz

2000s Czech sport aircraft
Light-sport aircraft
Single-engined tractor aircraft
Low-wing aircraft
SportStar